Forest John "Jake" Weber (March 18, 1918 – January 6, 1990) was an American professional basketball player. He played for the New York Knicks and the Providence Steamrollers during the 1946–47 season. He averaged 3.5 points and 0.1 assists per game.

BAA career statistics

Regular season

References

External links

1918 births
1990 deaths
Basketball players from Indiana
Centers (basketball)
Indianapolis Kautskys players
New York Knicks players
Purdue Boilermakers men's basketball players
Providence Steamrollers players
American men's basketball players